Mr. Job Yustino Ndugai (born 21 January 1963) is a Tanzanian politician and served as the Speaker of the National Assembly of Tanzania since November 2015 until his resignation on January 6. Previously he was Deputy Speaker from 2010 to 2015.

Early life and education
He was educated at Matare Primary School, Kibaha Secondary School and Old Moshi High School, udsm.

Political career
He has served as the member of parliament for the Kongwa constituency since 2000. Ndugai was named as the most active MP in the 9th Tanzanian Parliament.

Ndugai was Deputy Speaker of the National Assembly from 2010 to 2015. He was elected as Speaker of the National Assembly on 17 November 2015. Ndugai was also elected as Speaker for a second term in November 2020. Ndugai resigned on January 6.

References

1960 births
Living people
Speakers of the National Assembly (Tanzania)
Chama Cha Mapinduzi MPs
Tanzanian MPs 2000–2005
Tanzanian MPs 2005–2010
Tanzanian MPs 2010–2015
Tanzanian MPs 2015–2020
Tanzanian MPs 2020–2025
Kibaha Secondary School alumni
Old Moshi Secondary School alumni
College of African Wildlife Management alumni
University of Dar es Salaam alumni
Norwegian College of Agriculture alumni
Open University of Tanzania alumni